Westgard Pass is a mountain pass on State Route 168 in Inyo County, California in the U.S. state of California. Westgard Pass lies entirely within the Inyo National Forest, in northern Inyo County, California.

State Route 168 crosses the pass, connecting the Owens Valley to Deep Springs Valley. Route 168 is the only (paved) east–west route across the Inyo-White Mountains. The highway is known for its pristine scenery and grand vistas.

History 
The pass was named after Anton L. Westgard, the Norwegian-born Vice President and Director of Transcontinental Highways of the National Highway Association. Inyo County and the State of California bestowed the honor on Westgard after his successful transcontinental journey by automobile in 1911. Westgard, nicknamed "The Pathfinder" was appointed by Federal Highway Administration Director Logan Page to attempt the trek as research for appropriate locations for the first transcontinental highways. This initial field survey ultimately led to what would eventually become the Lincoln Highway.

Although not the first transcontinental voyage by motorized vehicle, Westgard claimed to be the first to have completed the journey by truck, his being a 37-horsepower "Pioneer Freighter".

External links 
 Information and photos of Westgard Pass and Highway 168
 The world-famous early Cambrian fossils that occur at and near Westgard Pass, California
 Article by A.L. Westgard from the March 1915 Motor Magazine

See also 
 List of mountain passes in California

References

External links 
 

Mountain passes of California
Landforms of Inyo County, California
Inyo Mountains
Inyo National Forest
Owens Valley
White Mountains (California)